Sigurjón may refer to:

Sigurjón Birgir Sigurðsson (born 1962), known as Sjón, Icelandic author and poet
Sigurjón Brink (1974–2011), also known as Sjonni or Sjonni brink, an Icelandic musician and singer
Sigurjón Þórðarson (born 1964), Icelandic politician
Sigurjón Kjartansson (born 1968), Icelandic comedian, writer and producer
Sigurjón Sighvatsson (born 1952), veteran Icelandic film producer and businessman

Icelandic masculine given names